The 2014 Andy Murray tennis season began at the Qatar Open. He was defending titles in Miami and at Queen's Club, as well as at Wimbledon. However, he failed to retain any of these, losing to Novak Djokovic, Radek Štěpánek and Grigor Dimitrov at each of these tournaments.

His form improved in the latter part of the season, as he won 3 titles in 5 weeks at Shenzhen, Vienna and Valencia. This saw him finish the year ranked world number 6.

Yearly Summary

Australian Open Series

Qatar Open
Murray made his competitive return to the tour at the Qatar Open, having been out injured since undergoing back surgery in September 2013. He faced local wildcard Mousa Shanan Zayed and took only 37 minutes to defeat him, not dropping a single game in the process. He then suffered a shock defeat to Florian Mayer in the following round. Having been in a commanding position, Murray lost 12 of the last 15 games to crash out in three sets.

Australian Open
Murray then competed at the Australian Open. He got his campaign underway in difficult conditions, with temperatures in excess of 40 degrees Celsius, against Go Soeda and saw him off in under 90 minutes, only dropping five games in the process. He next faced qualifier Vincent Millot and again won in straight sets, recovering from 5–1 down in the third to take it 7–5 by winning 23 consecutive points from set point down. Murray's first serious test came from Feliciano López but the top 30 player failed to trouble him as he secured another three set victory, to set up a fourth round clash with lucky loser Stéphane Robert. Murray dropped his first set of the tournament in a third set tie-break but recovered to take the fourth and progress to the quarter-finals. There he faced Roger Federer, in their fifth meeting at a Grand Slam. Murray was unable to match Federer's level throughout most of the match and was defeated in four sets, ending his run of four consecutive Australian Open semi-finals.

Spring hardcourt season

Davis Cup First round
Murray then represented Great Britain in the Davis Cup against the United States in San Diego. He won both his singles rubbers, first defeating Donald Young and then securing the 3–1 victory on the Sunday with a win over Sam Querrey. It was the first time that Great Britain had reached the quarterfinals of the Davis Cup since 1986.

Rotterdam Open
Following the Davis Cup tie, Murray travelled to Rotterdam to play in the Rotterdam Open. There he overcame Édouard Roger-Vasselin and Dominic Thiem to set up a quarter-final encounter with Marin Čilić. Murray struggled against Čilić, playing for the three consecutive days for the first time since surgery, and was unable to find his best form as he crashed out in straight sets.

Mexican Open
After his defeat to Čilić, Murray next chose to play in the Mexican Open for the first time. He recovered from a set down in his opener to defeat Pablo Andújar, and then overcame João Sousa to reach the quarter-finals. Again, Murray failed to find his best form but still managed to record his 12th consecutive win over Gilles Simon. In his first semi-final since winning Wimbledon the previous year, Murray suffered a three sets defeat to Grigor Dimitrov. Murray took the first set but then lost two close tie-breaks as Dimitorv recorded his first win over Murray.

Indian Wells Masters
Murray headed into the first Masters Series tournament of the year still struggling to find form. Matters failed to improve at the Indian Wells Masters as he struggled past Lukáš Rosol and Jiří Veselý, before being eliminated in the fourth round by Milos Raonic in a match where Murray admitted he "wasn't good enough". Following the tournament, Murray mutually split with his coach Ivan Lendl, ending their partnership after two years together.

Murray offered to play with 2012 Wimbledon Doubles champion Jonathan Marray because Marray was unable to convince anyone to join him on court. Marray was struggling for full fitness and finding a regular doubles partner, travelling to tournaments with no plan whatsoever. 
After fans queued around the grounds to watch Roger Federer and Stanislas Wawrinka play together, it was standing room only for Murray and Marray's first competitive match together. Andy Murray and Jonny Marray won a thrilling doubles clash against Gaël Monfils and Juan Mónaco only to lose in the second round to the No 2 seeds Alexander Peya and Bruno Soares.

Miami Masters
At the Miami Masters Murray began his title defence with a win over Matthew Ebden, recovering to take 12 of the last 13 games having lost the first set. Murray then turned in two of his better performances of the season to defeat Feliciano López and Jo-Wilfried Tsonga to reach the quarter-finals. The win over Tsonga was Murray's first victory over a top-20 player since his return from surgery. In the quarter-finals Murray took on Novak Djokovic for the first time since they played each other in the previous year's Wimbledon final. Murray was defeated in straight sets although the first set ended in controversial fashion with Djokovic playing a volley with his racquet over the net which the umpire allowed to stand. The defeat saw Murray slip to eighth in the world, his lowest ranking since 2008.

European clay court season

Davis Cup Quarterfinals
Great Britain faced Italy in the Davis Cup quarter-finals. Murray defeated Andreas Seppi in his opening rubber, although the conclusion of the match was delayed until the Saturday following a rain delay. Murray then had to play again on the Saturday as he teamed up with fellow Scot Colin Fleming to defeat Simone Bolelli and Fabio Fognini in the doubles rubber and put Britain 2–1 up. On the Sunday, Murray had to play his third best of five match in the space of two days as he took on Fognini in the reverse singles. The intense schedule proved too much for Murray as he was defeated in straight sets, ending his run of 19 consecutive Davis Cup singles wins which stretched back to his first appearance in the competition in 2005. James Ward then lost the decider to Seppi as Britain were defeated 3–2 and eliminated from the competition.

Madrid Open
Murray's first clay court tournament of the year was the Madrid Open. Murray opened up with a close three set victory over Nicolás Almagro, but his poor form on clay continued as he lost to qualifier Santiago Giraldo in the following round.

Italian Open
The Italian Open seemed to signal an upturn in Murray's fortunes. He first dismissed Marcel Granollers in straight sets, and was then equally as clinical as he celebrated his 27th birthday with a win over Jürgen Melzer to set up a quarter-final meeting with Rafael Nadal. In their first meeting since October 2011, Murray seized the early initiative and took the first set 6–1, but Nadal battled back to take the second. In the decider, Murray moved out to a 4–2 lead and was within touching distance of recording his first win over Nadal on clay. However, he was unable to see the match out and Nadal recovered to take the third 7–5.

French Open
Murray began his French Open with a four sets win over Andrey Golubev, and then defeated Marinko Matosevic to set up a third round match with Philipp Kohlschreiber. The 28th seeded German proved a much tougher prospect and after Murray failed to see out the match from a commanding position in the fourth set, play was abandoned due to bad light at 7–7 in the deciding fifth set. Despite having never been beyond 7–5 in a decider, Murray held his nerve to take it 12–10 when play resumed the following day. He then returned the next day to take on Fernando Verdasco, but this match proved less troublesome with Murray picking up the win in straight sets. In the quarter-finals, Murray played childhood friend Gaël Monfils and stormed into a two set lead. Monfils hit back though, winning the next two to take it to a decider. Despite the momentum seeming to be against Murray, he turned the match round spectacularly to take the final set 6–0 and reach the semi-finals, equalling his best ever result at the French Open. The result saw him become only the 10th man to reach multiple semi-finals at all four Grand Slams and also reach a British-record 14th Grand Slam semi-final. In the semi-finals he faced Rafael Nadal for the second consecutive tournament. Nadal was at his best throughout the match and Murray struggled to keep up, weakened by the two long, five-set matches he had already played. In the end, Nadal saw off Murray in under two hours, winning comfortably in straight sets.

Grass court season

Queen's Club Championships
Prior to the grass court season beginning, Murray appointed Amélie Mauresmo as his new coach. It was a surprise move which saw Mauresmo become the first woman to coach a high-profile male player. In their first tournament together, Murray recorded a straight sets win over Paul-Henri Mathieu as he attempted to defend his Queen's Club Championship title. However, he suffered a shock defeat to Radek Štěpánek in the following round, ending his 19 match win streak which stretched back to his 2012 Wimbledon final defeat to Roger Federer.

Wimbledon
Murray then attempted to become the first British man to defend a Wimbledon title since Fred Perry in 1936. He began his defence with a comfortable straight sets win over David Goffin, his 450th career win, and followed that up with an emphatic win over Blaž Rola in which he only dropped two games. His first real test was against 27th seed Roberto Bautista Agut, but the Spaniard proved no match for Murray who raced to another straight sets win in just over an hour and a half. Murray then defeated big serving Kevin Anderson, the 20th seed, to reach his seventh consecutive Wimbledon quarter-final. His defence then came to an abrupt halt as Grigor Dimitrov ended his 17 match winning-streak at Wimbledon with a straight sets win, meaning Murray failed to reach the semi-finals for the first time since 2008.

US Open Series

Canadian Open
Despite his ranking dropping to 10th after Wimbledon, withdrawals from Nadal and del Potro meant that Murray was seeded eighth for the Canadian Open and thus received a first round bye. Before the tournament began, Murray announced that he would be extending his partnership with Mauresmo until at least the end of the US Open but was ideally looking for a long-term deal. Murray also revealed that he hadn't been able to train fully earlier in the year following his back surgery last September, but had now returned to a full training schedule. In his opening match at the Canadian Open he faced wild card Nick Kyrgios, who had also been a Wimbledon quarter-finalist after upsetting Rafael Nadal. However, Murray faced no such issues with the Australian teenager and recorded a straight sets win in just under an hour. Murray then advanced to the quarter-finals after Richard Gasquet withdrew before their third round match with an abdominal injury. Murray was defeated at the quarter-final stage by eventual champion Jo-Wilfried Tsonga, despite having been a break up in the final set.

Cincinnati Masters
As with the Canadian Open, Murray received a first round bye at the Cincinnati Masters as the eight seed. He recorded a straight sets win over João Sousa in the second round, and then in the third round defeated 2013 finalist John Isner in a third set tie-break, having earlier saved two match points. He faced world No. 3 Roger Federer for a place in the semi-finals, but was defeated in straight sets. Murray had a double-break lead in the second set, but lost six of the last seven games to exit the tournament. As with the previous tournament, Murray lost to the eventual winner, with Federer going on to take the title two days later.

US Open
Murray went into the US Open as the eighth seed, his lowest seeding at a major since Wimbledon 2008. In the first round he faced Robin Haase where he looked to be heading for a routine straight sets victory. However, early in the third set, Murray suffered a bout of cramp and Haase was able to claw his way back into the match. It looked to be going all the way to a deciding set but Murray was able to come back from a break down to take the match in four. In the second round Murray defeated qualifier Matthias Bachinger in straight sets to set up a first meeting with Andrey Kuznetsov in the third round. He came through that encounter in four sets to set up a third meeting of the season with Jo-Wilfried Tsonga. Murray won in straight sets to record his first win over a top 10 player since his 2013 Wimbledon final victory over Novak Djokovic. It was Djokovic who he faced at the quarter-final stage of the tournament. In their 21st meeting the Serb proved to be too much for Murray, taking the win in four sets in a late match that lasted over three and a half hours.

Post–US Open tournaments

Shenzhen Open
Murray played his first tournament after the US Open when he took a wildcard into the Shenzhen Open, as the second seed. After receiving a bye in the first round he defeated Somdev Devvarman in the round of sixteen in straight sets to set up a quarter-final meeting with Lukáš Lacko. Murray again won in straight sets to reach the semi-finals. Murray had to recover from a set down to overcome Juan Mónaco and advance to his first final since winning Wimbledon the previous year. Murray picked up his first title of the season against Tommy Robredo, coming back after being a set down once again and saving five match points in the process.

China Open
The following week, Murray faced Jerzy Janowicz in the first round of the China Open, winning in three sets. In the second round he faced Pablo Cuevas, winning easily in straight sets, to set up a quarter-final meeting with US Open champion Marin Čilić. Murray obtained his second top 10 win of the season with a comfortable straight sets win. He then lost to world no. 1 Novak Djokovic in the semi-final in straight sets.

Shanghai Masters
Murray began the final leg of the Asian swing with a straight sets win over qualifier Teymuraz Gabashvili at the Shanghai Masters. Murray then faced Jerzy Janowicz for the second consecutive tournament, but this match proved to be easier than their previous encounter, with Murray winning in straight sets. His run was ended in third round by David Ferrer, as the fifth seed recovered from a set down to beat Murray in three sets.

Vienna Open
In an attempt to qualify for the World Tour Finals, Murray took a wild card into the Vienna Open. He defeated Vasek Pospisil in straight sets after receiving a first round bye to reach the quarter-final. More straight sets wins over Jan-Lennard Struff and Viktor Troicki followed as Murray reached the final. He once again faced David Ferrer, and triumphed in three sets for his second title of the season, and the 30th of his career.

Valencia Open
Continuing his attempt to qualify for the World Tour Finals, Murray entered the Valencia Open as a wild card. He defeated Jürgen Melzer and Fabio Fognini in straight sets to reach the quarter-finals, where he recovered from a set down against Kevin Anderson. In the semi-final he faced David Ferrer for the third time in as many weeks, and won in straight sets to set up a repeat of the Shenzhen Open final against Tommy Robredo. Murray defeated Robredo to take the title, and, in a repeat of the Shenzhen final, had to come from a set behind and save 5 match points to prevail.

Paris Masters
As the eighth seed, Murray received a bye in the first round of the Paris Masters. He opened with a straight sets win over Julien Benneteau in the second round. Murray then defeated Grigor Dimitrov in just over an hour to advance to the quarter-finals and seal his place at the end of season tour finals. Murray then attempted to record his first win of the season over Novak Djokovic, but it was the Serb who again came out on top in their fourth meeting, in what was also Murray's 23rd match in the space of 37 days.

ATP World Tour Finals
Murray was drawn in Group B at the ATP World Tour Finals, along with Roger Federer, Kei Nishikori and Milos Raonic. In his opening match, Murray was defeated in straight sets by Nishikori. It was his first loss to him, with Murray having won their previous three meetings. He bounced back in his second match, overcoming Raonic in straight sets. Murray went into his final group match with Federer knowing that a straight sets win was required in order to reach the semi-finals. However, he was thrashed in under an hour, winning only one game, and so was eliminated - finishing third in the group.

All matches
This table chronicles all the matches of Murray in 2014, including walkovers (W/O) which the ATP does not count as wins. They are marked ND for non-decision or no decision.

Singles matches

Doubles matches

Exhibition matches

Tournament schedule

Singles schedule

Yearly records

Head-to-head matchups
Ordered by number of wins
(Bold denotes a top 10 player at the time of match, Italic means top 50)

  Feliciano López 2–0
  João Sousa 2–0
  Jerzy Janowicz 2–0
  Jürgen Melzer 2–0
  Kevin Anderson 2–0
  Tommy Robredo 2–0
  Jo-Wilfried Tsonga 2–1
  David Ferrer 2–1
  Mousa Shanan Zayed 1–0
  Go Soeda 1–0
  Vincent Millot 1–0
  Stéphane Robert 1–0
  Donald Young 1–0
  Sam Querrey 1–0
  Édouard Roger-Vasselin 1–0
  Dominic Thiem 1–0
  Pablo Andújar 1–0
  Gilles Simon 1–0
  Lukáš Rosol 1–0
  Jiří Veselý 1–0
  Matthew Ebden 1–0
  Andreas Seppi 1–0
  Nicolas Almagro  1–0
  Marcel Granollers 1–0
  Andrey Golubev 1–0
  Marinko Matosevic 1–0
  Philipp Kohlschreiber 1–0
  Fernando Verdasco 1–0
  Gaël Monfils 1–0
  Paul-Henri Mathieu 1–0
  David Goffin 1–0
  Blaž Rola 1–0
  Roberto Bautista Agut 1–0
  Nick Kyrgios 1–0
  John Isner 1–0
  Robin Haase 1–0
  Matthias Bachinger 1–0
  Andrey Kuznetsov 1–0
  Somdev Devvarman 1–0
  Lukáš Lacko 1–0
  Juan Mónaco 1–0
  Pablo Cuevas 1–0
  Teymuraz Gabashvili 1–0
  Vasek Pospisil 1–0
  Jan-Lennard Struff 1–0
  Viktor Troicki 1–0
  Julien Benneteau 1–0
  Marin Čilić 1–1
  Fabio Fognini 1–1
  Milos Raonic 1–1
  Grigor Dimitrov 1–2
  Florian Mayer 0–1
  Santiago Giraldo 0–1
  Radek Stepanek 0–1
  Kei Nishikori 0–1
  Rafael Nadal 0–2
  Roger Federer 0–3
  Novak Djokovic 0–4

Finals

Singles: 3 (3–0)

Earnings

Bold font denotes tournament win

Awards
Arthur Ashe Humanitarian of the Year

See also
 2014 ATP World Tour
 2014 Roger Federer tennis season
 2014 Rafael Nadal tennis season
 2014 Novak Djokovic tennis season
 2014 Stanislas Wawrinka tennis season
 2014 Marin Čilić tennis season

Notes

References

External links
 
2014 Schedule at ATP Tour
2014 Schedule at Official Site 

Andy Murray tennis seasons
2014 in British sport
Murray, Andy